The Frances Appleton Pedestrian Bridge is a pedestrian bridge in Boston, Massachusetts that opened on August 31, 2018. The bridge, which crosses Storrow Drive, is named in recognition of the celebrated courtship and marriage of Frances “Fanny” Appleton and Henry Wadsworth Longfellow, after whom an adjacent larger bridge is named.

Design and construction 

The Frances Appleton Bridge was completed in 2018, at an estimated construction cost of $12.5 million. The bridge opened on August 31, 2018, and is owned by the Massachusetts Department of Conservation and Recreation.

The sculptural curves and lightness of the bridge make it appear to float above the parkland and its Y-shaped vertical supports mimic tree branches. Aesthetic lighting complements the narrow-beam pin lights that illuminate the walking path, creating a safe and interesting destination at night. The bridge enhances its historic setting while providing greater access and visibility to all users.

References

External links 

 MassDOT Longfellow Bridge Rehabilitation Project Website
 Miguel Rosales: Building a Better Bridge for Esplanade
 State seeks upgrade to Charles footbridge
 Longfellow Bridge Project to Impact Traffic, MBTA Service
 Frances Appleton Pedestrian Bridge Across Storrow Opens to the Public
 Miguel Rosales Discusses Iconic Bridges at TEA Annual Meeting
 Appleton Bridge Receives Arthur G. Hayden Medal
 Officials, Residents Cut Ribbon at Fanny Appleton Footbridge

Arch bridges in the United States
Appleton
Pedestrian bridges in Massachusetts
Steel bridges in the United States